Edward Hepple (4 June 1914 – 3 September 2005) was an Australian actor and television scriptwriter, best known for his roles in television serials, soap operas and TV movies. His well-known roles were as Sid Humphrey in Prisoner and the voice of the prospector in the animated series The Silver Brumby.

Stage 
He was part of the cast in the first public performance of Kenneth G. Ross's important Australian play Breaker Morant: A Play in Two Acts, presented by the Melbourne Theatre Company at the Athenaeum Theatre, in Melbourne, Victoria, Australia, on 2 February 1978.

Television 
Perhaps best known for his television appearances, his credits include:
 Barley Charlie (1964)
 Contrabandits (1967)
 Vega 4 (1968)
 Skippy the Bush Kangaroo (1968–69)
 The Rovers (1969–1970)
 Division 4 (1970–1971) (billed as Ted Hepple)
 Matlock Police (1971–1974)
 Prisoner (1981)
 The Flying Doctors (1989–1990)
 A Country Practice (1994).
 The Silver Brumby (1994-1998)

Scriptwriter
Hepple wrote scripts for television productions, usually billed as "Eddie Hepple" including: Class of '74. and The Dovers.
His script for the Homicide episode "The Corrupter" (screened 23 March 1971) is an early example of an Australian television storyline which took a neutral, and arguably sympathetic, attitude to male homosexuality.

He died in Melbourne, Victoria on 3 September 2005, age 91 of unspecified causes.

References

External links
 

1914 births
2005 deaths
20th-century Australian male actors
Australian male television actors
Australian male voice actors
Australian soap opera writers
Australian male television writers
20th-century Australian screenwriters